Speller Metcalfe is a UK based construction company. The firm was founded in 1995 and is headquartered in Malvern, Worcestershire, with locations in Gloucester, Wolverhampton and London.

History
Speller Metcalfe is a family-owned business, established in 1995 by construction surveyors Steve Speller and Andy Metcalfe. The company initially focused on the construction of residential & commercial buildings and small projects around Worcestershire and Herefordshire. As the business grew its work began to span across a more diverse range of sectors including education, automotive, sustainable construction, leisure and healthcare.

As of 2019, Speller Metcalfe has an annual turnover of £150m and employs more than 250 staff.

Awards and recognition
Speller Metcalfe has 

Considerate Constructors Scheme Silver Awards, 2013
 Green Apple Gold Award, 2013
 Cheltenham Civic Trust Award, 2012
 Gloucester Civic Award, 2012
 LABC award, 2011
 RIBA Award, 2010
 Cheltenham Civic Awards, 2010
 National Considerate Contractor Award, 2010
 LABC West of England Awards, 2009

References

External links
 Official website

British companies established in 1995
Construction and civil engineering companies of the United Kingdom
Construction companies based in London
Construction and civil engineering companies established in 1995
1995 establishments in England